Suraj Mal (13 February 1707 – 25 December 1763) was a  Jat ruler of Bharatpur in present-day state of Rajasthan. Under him, the Jat rule covered the present-day districts of Agra, Aligarh, Bharatpur, Dholpur, Etawa, Hathras, Mainpuri, Mathura, and Rohtak.

A contemporary historian had described him as "the Plato of the Jat tribe" and by a modern writer as the "Jat Ulysses", because of his "political sagacity, steady intellect and clear vision." The people, under Suraj Mal, overran the Mughal garrison at Agra. Suraj Mal was killed in an ambush by the Rohilla troops on the night of 25 December 1763 near the Hindon River, Shahadra, Delhi. In addition to the troops stationed at his forts, he had an army of 25,000 infantry and 15,000 cavalry when he died.

Early life
Suraj Mal was born on 13 February 1707, to Badan Singh and Rani Devki into a Hindu Jat family of Sinsinwar clan in Bharatpur, Mughal India (present-day Rajasthan, India). Suraj Mal was the founder of the Kingdom of Bharatpur. The Hindu Kingdom reached its zenith under Suraj Mal.

Establishment of Bharatpur
Suraj Mal conquered the site of Bharatpur from Khemkaran Sogaria, the son of Rustam, in 1733 and established Bharatpur town in 1743. He fortified the city by building a massive wall around the city and started living in Bharatpur from 1753.

Lohagarh Fort

Lohagarh Fort was considered an impregnable fort, it was built in 18th century by Suraj Mal. It remains the only fort in India that was never militarily subdued, even the British failed to capture it despite trying during several attacks under the command of British General Lake. The siege in 1805 lasted for six weeks but the British failed to conquer the fort. Suraj Mal built many other forts and palaces. The fort has three royal palaces inside built between 1730 and 1850.

The attack on the fort by General Lake was done as he wanted to create enmity between Rajput and Marathas so he reminded Ranjit Singh of Bharatpur of the treaty. At that time Holkar was in his protection and the Raja refused to hand him to the British. The British then laid a siege to the fort but were defeated badly. Many of their soldiers and officers were killed. After two days, the British managed to break a section of fort's wall and Suraj Mal attacked them with artillery.

In the third attack, the British successfully crossed the moat but the attack of maharaj filled the moat with the bodies of soldiers. General Lake was asked to secure a peace treaty but he refused, as he reasoned that reinforcement were arriving. The combined forces of Holkar, Amir Khan and Ranjit Singh of Bharatpur then attacked the British.

When the British forces was reinforced from the troops that came from Mumbai and Chennai, they renewed the attack. The British soldiers were attacked by boulders but some of them succeeded to enter the fort, the British however suffered heavy losses. Around 3,000 were killed and several thousand were injured. After this General Lake entered into a peace treaty with the Rajputs.

Jawahar Burj and the Fateh Burj were built to celebrate the victory over the Mughals and the British. The fort is surrounded by deep moats. There is a legend which states that the fort will fall down if a crocodile takes up all the water of the moats. Another legend states that a gate of the fort was brought from Delhi which Alauddin Khilji brought from the fort of Chittorgarh. The gate was brought and fixed in the fort in the 17th century.

Military career

Plunder of old Delhi 

The Mughal emperor had taken back the domain of Awadh and Allahabad from Safdar Jang, wazir of Oudh State , and to avenge his humiliation, Safdar Jang rebelled and attacked Delhi. Surajmal also fought under Safdar Jang against the Mughals.
On Suraj's advice, Safdar Jang reacted by appointing Akbar Ādilshāh as emperor. On 14 May the supporters of Surajmal sacked Chārbāg, Bāg-e-kultāt and Hakīm Munīm Bridge, and the next day Jaisinghpura, burning several areas. On 16 May Surajmal under Safdar Jang attacked Delhi and defeated Sādil Khan and Raja Devidatta in a battle.

Battle of Kumher

Mughal Emperor Alamgir II and his rebellious courtier Siraj ud-Daulah were having a factional feud. Suraj Mal had sided with Siraj. Alamgir sought the help of the Holkar Marathas of Indore. Khanderao Holkar, son of the Maharaja of Indore, Malhar Rao Holkar, laid a siege on Suraj Mal's Kumher in 1754. While inspecting the troops on an open palanquin in the battle of Kumher, Khanderao was hit and killed by a cannonball from the Bharatpur army. The siege was lifted and a treaty was signed between maharaj Suraj Mal and Marathas, which later proved helpful for Suraj Mal in consolidating his rule.

Battle of Bharatpur
It was fought between army of bharatpur and Afghans on 12 February 1757. Ruler Ahmad Shah Durrani of the Afghan Durrani empire, attacked on Bharatpur. Durrani dared not proceed to attack on Deeg. Suraj Mal's troops fought against him in Ballabgarh, Chaumunha, Gokul, Kumher and in Bharatpur. the army stopped Afghan army. Surajmal's forces defeat the Abdali's forces. At last Abdali had to leave the war and retreat. During this he ruined and looted the holy places of Mathura and Vrindavan.

Suraj Mal and Abdali
After his victory over Dattaji on 10 January 1760, Ahmad Shah came to Delhi, and called upon Suraj Mal to pay him tribute and join his camp. On such occasions Suraj Mal invariably played a humble role, pleading that he was a petty zamindar. He informed the Shah that he would readily pay his share to the lawful Government of Delhi at the fixed time of payment. If the Durrani stayed in India and assumed sovereignty, he would obey him as his legal master. At the time of demand he possessed no money as his country had been ruined by the constant movements and pillage of Marathas and Afghans. It was not in Durrani's nature to tolerate such defiance. He besieged Surajmal's fort of Dig on 6 February 1760*. After a short while he realized that it would require a very long period to reduce a strongly fortified, largely garrisoned and heavily provisioned fortress. In such cases he did not make it a matter of prestige. He quietly raised the siege, and marched in pursuit of Malhar Rao Holkar.

Having routed the Maratha chief at Sikandarabad on 4 March 1760, Ahmad Shah Durrani marched upon Koil (modern Aligarh) which belonged to Suraj Mal, and invested the fort of Ramgarh. It was commanded by Durjansal. The fort was well-garrisoned and fortified, and large stocks of provisions had been stored therein. The fort could have resisted for long; but the qiladar was disheartened at the occupation of the entire upper Ganga Doab by the Afghans, and to save himself from massacre he capitulated in a fortnight or so.

Capture of Agra Fort

Agra was the richest town during that period. Suraj Mal decided to capture Agra fort to re-establish his influence in doab region. The  gave the sanction for camping. Meanwhile, the army started entering the fort, which was resisted by the guards in which 200 people died. The army started war from Jama masjid. During this period Maharaja Suraj Mal stayed at Mathura to observe the situations. On 24 May 1761 Suraj Mal along with Imād and Gangadhar Tantya moved from Mathura, crossed Jamuna and reached Aligarh. From Aligarh his army moved and captured the areas of ruler koīl and Jalesar. They reached Agra to help his army at Agra in the first week of June. Suraj Mal arrested the family members of the guards staying in Agra town and pressurized the guards of fort for surrender. At last the  agreed to surrender by receiving a bribe of Rs 1 lakh and jagir of five villages. Thus after a seize of one month Maharaja Suraj Mal captured Agra Fort on 12 June 1761.

Death
Fight with Surajmal and Najib. The Rohilla under Najib-ud-daula had now been encircled and the war was inevitable. Ruhella alongside Baloch Sayyidu Muhammad Khan, Afzal Khan, Zaibita Khan had mobilized the troops which was still weaker in number and weaponry against King Surajmal Military. Suraj Mal's army foray on to the enemy was mobilized from both front and rear end and it was potent enough to have decimated the combined Rohilla and Baloch in two days, but a deceitful ambush by Sayyidu near the Hindon river base took Suraj Mal with surprise. Outnumbered and suddenly Suraj Mal attained Martyrdom on the night of 25 December 1763.

Legacy

His large cenotaph is at Kusum Sarovar, Govardhan, Uttar Pradesh. His imposing chattri is flanked on either side by two smaller chattris of his two wives, "Hansiya" and "Kishori". These memorial chattris were built by his son and successor Jawahar Singh. The architecture and carving is in the pierced stone style and the ceiling of cenotaphs are adorned with paintings of the life of Krishna and Suraj Mal. His court poet Sūdan recorded his biography in Sujān Charitra.

Notable institutes named after him include Maharaja Surajmal Institute of Technology, Maharaja Surajmal Brij University, Bharatpur and Surajmal Stadium metro station.

In popular culture
 In 2019 Hindi film Panipat, Suraj Mal's character was portrayed by Manoj Bakshi.
 In 1994 Hindi TV series The Great Maratha, Suraj Mal's character was portrayed by Arun Mathur.

See also

 Principality of Farrukhnagar

References

Further reading

External links
 Suraj Mal at Britannica

Rulers of Bharatpur state
History of Rajasthan
History of Uttar Pradesh
History of Haryana
Medieval India
Hindu monarchs
1707 births
1763 deaths
Jat